SNCAC (the , sometimes known as ) was a French aircraft manufacturer created by the nationalisation of the Farman Aviation Works and Hanriot firms in 1936.

It was liquidated in 1949, with assets distributed between SNCAN, SNCASO, and SNECMA, all of which were nationalised firms.

Aircraft
SNCAC NC.130
SNCAC NC.150
SNCAC NC 211 Cormoran
SNCAC NC.270
SNCAC NC-290 - abandoned project for a four-engined (Nene-powered) jet transport for 60 passengers.
SNCAC NC.420
Farman NC.470
SNCAC NC.510
SNCAC NC.530
SNCAC NC-600
SNCAC NC.701 Martinet
SNCAC NC.702 Martinet
SNCAC NC.800 Cab - abandoned project for a light twin-engined transport
NC.832 Chardonneret
NC.840 Chardonneret
NC.841 Chardonneret
SNCAC NC.851
SNCAC NC.853
SNCAC NC.854
SNCAC NC.855
SNCAC NC.856
SNCAC NC.900
SNCAC NC.1070
SNCAC NC.1071
SNCAC NC 1080
SNCAC NC.2001 Abeille
SNCAC NC.3021 Belphégor

Defunct aircraft manufacturers of France
Manufacturing companies established in 1936
Manufacturing companies disestablished in 1949